Loon Lake is a lake on Vancouver Island that is north  of Mount Arrowsmith and east of Port Alberni.

References

Alberni Valley
Lakes of Vancouver Island
Lakes of British Columbia
Alberni Land District